Da Mouth was a Taiwanese hip hop band made up of MC40, DJ Chung Hua, male vocalist Harry, and female vocalist Aisa. They were formed in 2007 and disbanded in 2016. They are considered the Asian The Black Eyed Peas due to the group's diversity. The band's Chinese band name directly translates into "big mouth". Their English band name is derived from the concatenation of the Chinese character for "big" 大, which when romanized using pinyin becomes "dà", and the translation of the second half of their Chinese band name. They released their self-titled debut album Da Mouth on 16 November 2007.

The group won Best Singing Group at the 19th Golden Melody Awards in 2008 and at the 22nd Golden Melody Awards in 2011.

Members
 Chung Hua - Taiwanese / Japanese - DJ
 Harry (張懷秋) - Taiwanese (mixed Korean) - male lead vocalist
 MC40 (薛仕凌) - Taiwanese  - MC/Rapper
 Aisa Senda (千田愛紗) - Japanese - female lead vocalist

Career
The group is formed by: Canadian-Taiwanese MC40 (薛仕凌), Korean-Taiwanese-American male vocalist Harry (張懷秋), Japanese-Taiwanese DJ Chung Hua (宗華), and Japanese female vocalist Aisa (千田愛紗).

Harry grew up in San Mateo County, California, located around San Francisco. MC40 was raised in Vancouver, Canada. He writes most of Da Mouth's lyrics on the album and is considered one of the best and fastest rappers in Taiwan with his multi-language rapping ability. Aisa was born in Japan, and was originally a member of Sunday Girls from the popular Taiwanese television program Super Sunday before she joined the group. DJ Chung Hua moved to Japan with his parents at the age of 14. He is known as the producer of the group and he had won many DJ awards internationally.

Their debut album titled Da Mouth was released on 16 November 2007. In 2010 they released their third album One Two Three (万凸3). The lead track "喇舌" is listed at number 42 on Hit Fm Taiwan's Hit Fm Annual Top 100 Singles Chart (Hit-Fm年度百首單曲) for 2010.

Discography

Awards and nominations

References

External links

  Da Mouth@Universal Music Taiwan

Taiwanese hip hop groups
Mandopop musical groups